Eupithecia testacea is a moth in the family Geometridae. It is found in south-western China (Yunnan).

The wingspan is about 18 mm. The forewings are pale brown, becoming chestnut with an orange tinge on the distal part of the wing along the inner margin. The hindwings are brownish white, suffused with darker brown in the anal area.

References

Moths described in 2004
testacea
Moths of Asia